The First Circle is a 2006 Russian miniseries directed by Gleb Panfilov, with ten 44-minute episodes. It is based on The First Circle, the novel written by Aleksandr Solzhenitsyn based on his experiences in Joseph Stalin's Gulag. The series was first broadcast in the Russia on Telekanal
Rossiya on January 29, 2006.

Plot
Based on Aleksandr Solzhenitsyn's autobiographical novel and set during the fearful times of Stalin's mass arrests, the series takes place in a sharashka, a prison-laboratory for secret research where Russia's greatest minds are put to government use. While living conditions in this "first circle of hell" are incomparably superior to the Gulag camps, the scientists there face the moral dilemma of cooperating with an inhuman system. The action begins when a Ministry of Foreign Affairs official makes an anonymous phone call to the American embassy, trying to warn them about a leak of information that would allow the USSR to build the atomic bomb. In order to identify the traitor, the KGB turns to one of the projects at the sharashka. The character of Gleb Nerzhin (Yevgeny Mironov), a mathematician who chooses the horrors of the Gulag rather than compromise his conscience, is based on Solzhenitsyn himself. The First Circle is a hard but optimistic story about the victory of the human spirit over totalitarianism.

Cast
 Yevgeny Mironov – Gleb Nerzhin
 Dmitry Pevtsov – Innokenty Volodin
 Olga Drozdova – Volodin's wife
 Igor Sklyar – Illarion Gerasimovich
 Inna Churikova – Gerasimovich's wife
 Albert Filozov – Uncle Avenir
 Kseniya Kachalina – Potapov's wife
 Galina Tunina – Nadya Nerzhina
 Roman Madyanov – Abakumov
 Igor Kvasha – Joseph Stalin
 Alexander Solzhenitsyn – narrator's voice
 Yevgeni Grishkovetz – Galakhov, writer 
 Vladimir Konkin – Professor Verenev
 Nina Shatskaya – Nina 
 Maxim Shchyogolev – torturer, episode
 Boris Romanov – professor Chelnov
 Yevgeny Stychkin – Pryanchikov

References

External links
 Film site 
 
 Movie Info

Russia-1 original programming
Films based on works by Aleksandr Solzhenitsyn
Russian television miniseries
Films directed by Gleb Panfilov
2006 Russian television series debuts
2006 Russian television series endings
2000s Russian television series